Pseudastylopsis nelsoni is a species of beetle in the family Cerambycidae. It was described by Linsley and Chemsak in 1995.

References

Acanthocinini
Beetles described in 1995